Maimetsha arctica is an extinct genus of wasp which existed during the Cretaceous period, and the only species in the genus Maimetsha.

References

Stephanoidea
Prehistoric Hymenoptera genera
Cretaceous insects
Hymenoptera of Africa
Prehistoric insects of Africa